The 2013 Nationwide Children's Hospital 200 was the 22nd stock car race of the 2013 NASCAR Nationwide Series and the inaugural iteration of the event. The race was held on Saturday, August 17, 2013, in Lexington, Ohio at the Mid-Ohio Sports Car Course, a 2.258 miles (3.634 km) permanent road course. The race was extended from its scheduled 90 laps to 94 due to a green–white–checker finish. At race's end, A. J. Allmendinger, driving for Penske Racing, would dominate the race to win his second career NASCAR Nationwide Series win and his second and final win of the season. To fill out the podium, Michael McDowell of Joe Gibbs Racing and Sam Hornish Jr. of Penske Racing would finish second and third, respectively.

Background 

The track is a road course auto racing facility located in Troy Township, Morrow County, Ohio, United States, just outside the village of Lexington. Mid-Ohio has also colloquially become a term for the entire north-central region of the state, from south of Sandusky to the north of Columbus.

The track opened as a 15-turn, 2.4 mile (3.86 km) road circuit run clockwise. The back portion of the track allows speeds approaching 180 mph (290 km/h). A separate starting line is located on the backstretch to allow for safer rolling starts. The regular start / finish line is located on the pit straight. There is grandstand seating for 10,000 spectators and three observation mounds alongside the track raise the capacity to over 75,000.

Entry list 

 (R) denotes rookie driver.
 (i) denotes driver who is ineligible for series driver points.

Practice

First practice 
The first practice session would occur on Thursday, August 15, at 9:00 AM EST and would last for three hours.

Second practice 
The second practice session would occur on Thursday, August 15, at 1:30 PM EST and would last for two hours and 30 minutes.

Third practice 
The third practice session would occur on Friday, August 16, at 11:300 PM EST and would last for one hour.

Fourth and final practice 
The fourth and final practice session, sometimes referred to as Happy Hour, would occur on Friday, August 16, at 1:30 PM EST and would last for two hours.

Qualifying 
Qualifying was held on Saturday, August 17, at 9:30 AM EST. Each driver would have one lap to set a time.

Three drivers would fail to qualify: T. J. Bell, Dexter Stacey, and Tim Cowen.

Full qualifying results

Race results

Standings after the race 

Drivers' Championship standings

Note: Only the first 12 positions are included for the driver standings.

References 

2013 NASCAR Nationwide Series
NASCAR races at Mid-Ohio Sports Car Course
August 2013 sports events in the United States
2013 in sports in Ohio